Statistics of Austrian national league in the 1973–74 season.

Overview
It was contested by 17 teams, and VÖEST Linz won the championship.

From 1973–74 season, Wiener AC formed a joint team with FK Austria Wien, which was called FK Austria WAC Wien until 1976–77 season when Austria Wien decided to revert to their own club's traditional name. The results of the joint team are part of the Austria Wien football history.

League standings

Results

References
Austria - List of final tables (RSSSF)

Austrian Football Bundesliga seasons
Aust
1973–74 in Austrian football